Valgus is a genus of beetles. Most described species are found in Asia, with some reaching into northern Africa and Europe, and three species native to the New World. One species is found in South Africa.

Species
 Valgus albomaculatus Kraatz, 1896 — Borneo
 Valgus arabicus Nonfried, 1895 — Arabia
 Valgus californicus Horn, 1870 — Mexico, California
 Valgus canaliculatus (Olivier, 1789) — United States
 Valgus cristatus Gestro, 1891 — Borneo
 Valgus distinctus Nonfried, 1895 — Borneo
 Valgus fuscatus Kraatz, 1896 — Borneo
 Valgus hemipterus (Linnaeus, 1758) — Europe, Caucasus, Northern Africa, introduced to North America: Ontario, Michigan, Ohio
 Valgus koreanus Sawada, 1944 — Korea
 Valgus okajimai Kobayashi, 1994 — Taiwan
 Valgus parvicollis Fairmaire, 1891 — China
 Valgus parvulus Burmeister & Schaum, 1840 — Thailand
 Valgus quadrimaculatus Kraatz, 1883 — Malaysia
 Valgus savioi Pic, 1928 — China
 Valgus seticollis (Palisot de Beauvois, 1805) — USA
 Valgus smithii Macleay, 1838 — South Africa
 Valgus sumatranus Gestro, 1891 — Sumatra
 Valgus thibetanus Nonfried, 1891 — Tibet
 Valgus tonkinensis Arrow, 1944 — North Vietnam

References
 World Scarabaeidae Database, Oct 2007

Cetoniinae